Rosecare is a hamlet in the parish of St Gennys, Cornwall, England. Rosecare is east of Higher Crackington.

References

Hamlets in Cornwall